In programming languages, monomorphization is a compile-time process where polymorphic functions are replaced by many monomorphic functions for each unique instantiation. This transformation is desirable, since then the output intermediate representation (IR) will have concrete types and can be optimized better. Furthermore, most IRs are designed to be low-level and do not support polymorphism. Code generated this way is typically faster than boxed types, but may compile slower and take more space due to duplicating the function body.

Example
This is an example of a use of a generic identity function in Rust
fn id<T>(x: T) -> T {
    return x;
}

fn main() {
    let int = id(10);
    let string = id("some text");
    println!("{int}, {string}");
}

After monomorphization, this would become

fn id_i32(x: i32) -> i32 {
    return x;
}

fn id_str(x: &str) -> &str {
    return x;
}

fn main() {
    let int = id_i32(10);
    let string = id_str("some text");
    println!("{int}, {string}");
}

See also
 Parametric polymorphism
 Type erasure
 Template (C++)

References 

Polymorphism (computer science)